The Rittenhouse Club is a private institution in Philadelphia, Pennsylvania. It was founded in 1875 to allow "businessmen, intellectuals and artists to socialize in a congenial, friendly atmosphere."

History
The Gentlemen's club was founded in 1874 as the Social Arts Club of Philadelphia by Dr. William Pepper and Silas Weir Mitchell. The club was renamed in late 1875 when it moved to a new building on Rittenhouse Square that had been the home of James Harper.

James E. Carpenter, Esquire was later the governor of the Rittenhouse Club. He was instrumental at securing the former home of Congressman James Harper] in 1875.

By 1880, the northern side of Rittenhouse Square was the defacto "most fashionable address in Philadelphia." In 1900, the club expanded by adding an adjoining townhouse. This created not only a larger structure but also more prestige fronting the square.

The Rittenhouse Club had many of the faculty of the University of Pennsylvania along with gentlemen architects such as from the T-Square Club. Members of the Northern Pennsylvania business elite intermingled with architects, professors and clergymen. These included during the fashionable Gilded Age, steamship magnate Clement Griscom, architect Frank Furness, along with his Shakespeare scholar sibling Horace Furness. The University of Pennsylvania provost Dr. William Pepper, his nephew Senator George Wharton Pepper, and financier E.T. Stotesbury held prominent positions in the Club.

After the end of World War II, due to tax loopholes being removed, general business changes and economics caused many members to move to the suburbs. The Rittenhouse Club suffered a slow decline of members and the "building slid from elegance into genteel decay."

In the early 1990s the Rittenhouse Club building was finally closed and sold. Today, "Only the discreet letters “RC” on the brass doorplates identify 1811 Walnut Street as the former home of one of Philadelphia's most prestigious clubs. The Beaux-Arts facade remains, but the building behind it is gone."

Early Members
James Edward Carpenter (1841-1901).
Louis H. Carpenter (1839-1916).
Edward Walter Clark, Jr. (1857-1946).
Frank Furness (1839-1912).
George Fort Gibbs (1870-1942).
George Byron Gordon (1870-1927).
Robert Sturgis Ingersoll.
George W. Pepper (1867-1961).
Owen Wister (1860-1938).

Selected publications
 Nathaniel Burt, The Perennial Philadelphians: The Anatomy of an American Aristocracy (Philadelphia, PA: University of Pennsylvania Press, 1999),, p.264.
 Nancy Heinzen, Perfect Square: A History of Rittenhouse Square (Philadelphia, PA: Temple University Press, 2009), p.95.
 Liz Spikol, “Comcast CEO Brian Roberts Buys at 10 Rittenhouse,” CurbedPhilly, October 19, 2012.  http://philly.curbed.com/archives/2012/10/19/comcast-ceo-brian-roberts-buys-part-of-10-rittenhouse.php

References

External links

Organizations established in 1875
Buildings and structures in Philadelphia
Clubs and societies in Philadelphia
1875 establishments in Pennsylvania